Saint-Floris is a commune in the Pas-de-Calais department in the Hauts-de-France region of France.

Geography
The canalized river Lys flows through the commune, forming part of the border with the department of Nord.

Population

Places of interest
 The church of St. Florent, rebuilt, along with much of the village, after the First World War.
 The Commonwealth War Graves Commission cemetery.

See also
Communes of the Pas-de-Calais department

References

External links

 Unofficial website of the village 
 The CWGC graves in the churchyard

Saintfloris